Unión Deportiva Santa Mariña is a Spanish football club based in Cabral, a parish of Vigo in the autonomous community of Galicia.

Home matches are held at Instalaciones Deportivas de Cotogrande, and team colours are red shirt, blue shorts and red socks.

History
Santa Mariña was founded in 1942 as C.D. Cabral, changing its name five years later to Unión Deportiva Santa Mariña de Cabral. Over the years the club focused in youth development, and as such did not have a proper senior team, but various youth sides competing in separate divisions according to their age groups. It currently has an amateur senior side that competes in the regional lower leagues.

Notable former players
 Santiago Formoso
 Jonathan Pereira
 Iago Aspas
 Brais Méndez
 Rubén Blanco
 Yelko Pino
 Gabri Veiga

External links
 Official website 

Football clubs in Galicia (Spain)
1947 establishments in Spain